Re Bank of Credit and Commerce International SA (No 8) [1998] AC 214 is a UK insolvency law case, concerning the taking of a security interest over a company's assets and priority of creditors in a company winding up.

Facts
BCCI made loans to a number of companies and in its contract purported to take as security, in return for the loans, a charge over the money in the bank accounts these companies held with BCCI. In an earlier case, In re Charge Card Services Ltd Millett J had said it was "conceptually impossible" for a bank to have a charge over assets that were held in an account of its own, on the basis that a bank account is an intangible debt recorded in figures in the bank's own books, and a bank's debt to its customer was not something that the customer could 'own' and charge out. The liquidators of BCCI applied for directions about whether, when they were recovering loans from the main debtor companies they should set off the amounts in credit in the deposit accounts under the Insolvency Rules 1986 rule 4.90.

The High Court held that since the security agreements did not impose personal liability on the third parties for the loans, the companies had no right to set-off under rule 4.90. In the Court of Appeal Millet LJ gave the leading judgment and said ‘a man cannot have a proprietary interest in a debt or other obligation which he owes another.’ The charges were conceptually impossible. Yet they were nevertheless good security by reason of the contractual provision limiting the right to repayment and that there were no grounds for holding that they were ineffective unless construed as imposing personal liability.

Judgment
Lord Hoffmann held that the charges were valid and not conceptually impossible. He referred to the general attributes of charges and went on. He said the right to claim payment of a deposit with a bank is a chose in action - a proprietary right. It can be granted to a third party. So a charge could be created over a deposit in favour of BCCI. He said as follows.

See also

UK insolvency law

Notes

References
L Sealy and S Worthington, Cases and Materials in Company Law (8th edn OUP 2008) 472-473

United Kingdom company case law
United Kingdom insolvency case law
1997 in case law
1997 in British law
House of Lords cases
Re Bank of Credit and Commerce International SA (No 8)